Coladenia agni is a species of spread-winged skipper butterflies. It is commonly found in Myanmar, Thailand, Laos and the Indian state of Sikkim.

Subspecies
Coladenia agni agni (Sikkim to Burma, Thailand, Laos and China: Hainan)
Coladenia agni sundae de Jong & Treadaway, 1992 (Sumatra)

References

Pyrginae
Butterflies described in 1884
Butterflies of Indochina
Taxa named by Lionel de Nicéville